Andrew Patrick Parrish (born December 8, 1997) is an American professional baseball pitcher for the Kansas City Royals organization.

Amateur career
Parrish attended Rockledge High School in Rockledge, Florida, and Florida State University, where he played college baseball for the Florida State Seminoles. The Royals selected Parrish in the eighth round, with the 229th overall selection, of the 2019 MLB draft, and he signed with the Royals.

Professional career
Parrish made his professional debut with the Burlington Royals.

After the cancellation of the 2020 minor league season due to the COVID-19 pandemic, Parrish began the 2021 season with the Quad Cities River Bandits, and was promoted to the Northwest Arkansas Naturals during the season. In May 2021, Parrish was named to the roster of the United States national baseball team for the Americas qualifying tournament for the 2020 Summer Olympics. He was not included on the roster for the Olympics.

Parrish began the 2022 season with Northwest Arkansas and was promoted to the Omaha Storm Chasers in June.

References

External links

1997 births
Living people
United States national baseball team players
Baseball pitchers
Florida State Seminoles baseball players
Burlington Royals players
Quad Cities River Bandits players
Northwest Arkansas Naturals players
Omaha Storm Chasers players